Sir Laurence Cox (died 26 August 1792) was an English politician from Woolcombe, Dorset.

Originally a merchant from London, Cox was a Member (MP) of the Parliament of Great Britain for Honiton from 1774 to 1780 and for Bere Alston from 14 February 1781 to 1784.

He was knighted in 1786.

References

Year of birth missing
1792 deaths
18th-century English people
Politicians from Dorset
British MPs 1774–1780
British MPs 1780–1784
Members of the Parliament of Great Britain for Bere Alston
Knights Bachelor
Members of the Parliament of Great Britain for Honiton